Gabriele Perico (born 11 March 1984) is an Italian professional footballer who plays as a right back for Virtus Bergamo in the Serie D. He is a former Italy U20 international.

Club career
Perico started his career at hometown club Atalanta. In the 2003–04 season he left for Prato.

AlbinoLeffe
In summer 2004, he was signed by Serie B side AlbinoLeffe from Prato along with Mauro Belotti and Alessandro Diamanti. The Province of Bergamo based club, also signed Primavera teammate Joelson (in a co-ownership deal) and Mauro Minelli (on loan) from Atalanta.

He made his Serie B debut for AlbinoLeffe in a 2–0 victory against Venezia, on 11 September 2004.

Cagliari
On 9 August 2010 Perico joined Cagliari along with Simon Laner on loan for €750,000 (€375,000 each or €350,000 each plus Cocco) with option to co-own the players.

On 21 June 2011 Cagliari excised the rights to sign the player in co-ownership deal for €375,000 in a 3-year contract. Cagliari also bought back Cocco for €150,000. In June 2012 Cagliari acquired Perico outright for €200,000, but Cocco also acquired by AlbinoLeffe outright for €200,000. The deals made Cagliari paid €950,000 to AlbinoLeffe for Perico, or €725,000 cash plus signing Cocco twice.

Cesena

On 16 July 2014, Perico signed for Serie A side Cesena. After being relegated from Serie A after the 2014/15 season, Cesena finished 6th in Serie B during the 2015/16 season. He was released at the end of the 2015/16 season, after making 56 appearances and scoring 3 goals for the club.

In July 2016, Perico joined English side Leeds United on trial. He played for Leeds first team in their final preseason friendly against Serie A side Atalanta B.C. where he started in a 2–1 win. However, he failed to earn a permanent deal at the club.

Salernitana
On 31 August he joined Serie B club Salernitana on a free transfer. He signed a 2-year contract.

FC Chiasso
On 4 January 2019, Perico signed with FC Chiasso in Switzerland.

International career
Perico has represented Italy at various age groups including  Italy U20's. He also won the 2003 UEFA European Under-19 Championship. Perico was capped for the Italy under-17 team at 2001 UEFA European Under-16 Championship (after 2001 the tournament was renamed the under-17 championship, but with the same age limit).

Honours

International
Italy Under-19
 UEFA European Under-19 Championship: 2003

References

External links
  Gabriele Perico at Soccerway
  Gabriele Perico National Team Stats  at FIGC.it
  Gabriele Perico at Tuttocalciatori

1984 births
Footballers from Bergamo
Living people
Italian footballers
Italian expatriate footballers
Italy youth international footballers
Association football defenders
Serie A players
Serie B players
Serie C players
Serie D players
Atalanta B.C. players
Swiss Challenge League players
U.C. AlbinoLeffe players
Cagliari Calcio players
A.C. Cesena players
A.C. Monza players
A.C. Prato players
U.S. Salernitana 1919 players
U.S. Livorno 1915 players
FC Chiasso players
Virtus Bergamo Alzano Seriate 1909 players
Italian expatriate sportspeople in Switzerland
Expatriate footballers in Switzerland